UJR may refer to:

 Rebellion Youth Union, the youth wing of the Revolutionary Communist Party in Brazil
 Unanimous justified representation, a criterion for evaluating the fairness of electoral systems
 Unsecured Judicial Release, a term for personal recognizance bonds used in some jurisdictions 
 the airline code for Universal Jet Rental de Mexico
 União do Judaismo Reformista, the regional organisation of the World Union for Progressive Judaism in Brazil